Cosmopterix aculeata is a moth of the family Cosmopterigidae. It is known from India (Assam), China and Australia.

It is multivoltine, with adults recorded from March to November.

References

aculeata
Moths described in 1909